The Congarees is a historic archaeological site located near Cayce, Lexington County, South Carolina. The site was established as early as 1691, and served as a frontier outpost, early township settlement, and crossroads of the great trade paths of the Catawba and Cherokee nations. The Fort Congaree back country fort was established on the site in 1718.

It was listed on the National Register of Historic Places in 1974.

References 

Archaeological sites on the National Register of Historic Places in South Carolina
Buildings and structures in Lexington County, South Carolina
National Register of Historic Places in Lexington County, South Carolina